Abu Zayd Ibn Rizq Al-Hilali  was an 11th-century Arab leader and hero of the 'Amirid tribe of Banu Hilal.

On the orders of the Ismaili Fatimid caliph, Abu Zayd moved his tribe to Tunisia via Egypt to punish the Zirids for adopting Sunniism. The Banu Hilali weakened largely the Zirid state and sacked Kairouan. The event was fictionalized in the epic Taghribat Bani Hilal. In the epic it is said that he was murdered by his rival Dhieb bin Ghanim.

11th-century Arabs
Arab culture
Shia Muslims
Generals of the Fatimid Caliphate
Arab generals
11th-century people from the Fatimid Caliphate
Banu Hilal